Sir Llewellyn Roy Edwards  (2 August 1935 – 26 May 2021), known as Llew Edwards, was a Queensland state politician and state Liberal Party leader. He was Chair and CEO of Brisbane's World Expo '88.

Early life and education
Llew Edwards started his working life as an electrician in his family's electrical business. He graduated from the University of Queensland with an M.B.B.S. in 1965.

Political career 
Edwards entered the Queensland Legislative Assembly as the Liberal member for Ipswich in 1972. He was the Minister for Health between 1974–1978 and then held the position of Liberal Party leader, Deputy Premier and Treasurer until 1983 when he retired from the Queensland Parliament to take on the role of Chairman and Chief Executive of World Expo '88, held in Brisbane in 1988.

Later activities
Edwards was Chair and CEO of the 1988 World Exposition, Brisbane's World Expo '88.

In 1993, he was elected the twelfth Chancellor of the University of Queensland, holding the office until 9 February 2009. He received an Honorary Doctor of Laws degree from the university in 1988.

In 1984, he was made a Knight Bachelor and, in 1989, a Companion of the Order of Australia. 

Edwards has sat on the boards of a number of publicly listed companies. He was a director of James Hardie Industries for a decade, and was appointed chairman of the Medical Research and Compensation Foundation, set up by James Hardie to provide financial compensation for victims of asbestos-related diseases caused by the company's products. He criticised the company for providing insufficient funds for the foundation, stating that it had underestimated the amount of liability for claims.

In 2009, the Sir Llew Edwards Building at the University of Queensland's St Lucia campus is named after him.

In 2010, Edwards was named by premier Anna Bligh as one of six "Queensland Greats". The citation stated that he was "an outstanding Queenslander who has made exceptional contributions to many fields".

On 28 April 2013, a plaque commemorating the 25th anniversary of World Expo 88 and Llew Edward's leadership of the event was unveiled at the South Bank Parklands (the site of Expo 88) by Brisbane Lord Mayor Graham Quirk and Queensland Premier Campbell Newman.

Later life 
Edwards died on 26 May 2021 in Brisbane. He was 85 years old and had been suffering from dementia. A state funeral was held at 2pm on Thursday 3 June 2021 at the St John's Cathedral in Brisbane with the Australian flag being flown at half-mast throughout Queensland.

References

Further reading

External links 

 Sir Llew Edwards digital story and oral history - State Library of Queensland
 Principal Officers of the University of Queensland
 University of Queensland re-elects Chancellor and Deputy-Chancellor – UQ News Online, 08/02/2002
 

1935 births
2021 deaths
University of Queensland
Australian Knights Bachelor
Australian politicians awarded knighthoods
Medical doctors from Brisbane
Medical doctors from Queensland
University of Queensland Mayne Medical School alumni
Companions of the Order of Australia
Deputy Premiers of Queensland
Members of the Queensland Legislative Assembly
Liberal Party of Australia members of the Parliament of Queensland
Politicians awarded knighthoods
Treasurers of Queensland
University of Queensland alumni
Queensland Greats